Mariska is a female given name. 
People bearing it include:
Mariska Karasz (1898–1960), Hungarian-American fashion designer, author, and textile artist
Mariska Aldrich (1881–1965), American dramatic soprano singer and actress
Mariska Veres (1947–2006), Dutch singer, lead singer for Shocking Blue
Mariska Mast (1985–2008), Dutch national, possibly a murder victim
Mariska Hargitay (born 1964), American film and television actress 
Mariska Hulscher (born 1964), Dutch TV presenter
Mariska Majoor (born 1968), Dutch founder of the Prostitution Information Center
Mariska Kramer (born 1974), Dutch triathlete, duathlete and long-distance runner
Mariska (rapper) (born 1979),  Finnish solo performer, former partner in Mariska & Pahat Sudet
Mariska Huisman (born 1983), Dutch marathon skater and speedskater
Mariska Kornet (born 1988), Dutch cricketer

See also
Gregoria Mariska, Indonesian badminton player

Dutch feminine given names